Al Habo Senoussi (born 15 October 1966), commonly known as Bob Senoussi, is a Chadian former professional footballer who played as a defender.

References

1966 births
Living people
Association football defenders
Chadian footballers
OGC Nice players
Quimper Kerfeunteun F.C. players
Stade Rennais F.C. players
Pau FC players
Grenoble Foot 38 players
Le Mans FC players
Lille OSC players
ASOA Valence players
Ligue 1 players
Ligue 2 players
Chadian expatriate footballers
Expatriate footballers in France
Chadian expatriate sportspeople in France